Otopharynx brooksi is a species of cichlid endemic to Lake Malawi.  This species can reach a length of  TL.  This species can also be found in the aquarium trade. The specific name of this fish honours John Langdon Brooks (1920-2000), an evolutionary biologist at Yale University.

References

brooksi
Fish of Lake Malawi
Fish of Malawi
Fish described in 1989
Taxonomy articles created by Polbot